48 Librae is a single shell star in the constellation Libra. It is a variable star with the designation FX Lib, ranging in magnitude from 4.74 to 4.96. It is a candidate member of the Upper Scorpius group of the Scorpius–Centaurus association, with the former having an age of about 11 million years.

This is a main sequence Be star with a stellar classification of B3 Vsh, although it has been variously classed as B3V, B5IIIp shell He-n, B6p shell, B4III, B3IV:e-shell, and B3 shell by different sources. As is the norm for a shell star, it is spinning very rapidly with a projected rotational velocity of 400 km/s − matching or exceeding 80% of the critical velocity. This is giving the star a pronounced oblate shape with an equatorial bulge that is estimated to be 43% larger than the polar radius. It has six times the mass of the Sun and four times the Sun's radius. The star is radiating 1,100 times the Sun's luminosity from its photosphere at an effective temperature of 7,612 K.

Some time between 1931 and 1935, the disk became active and has remained so since that time, becoming the subject of multiple studies. The unusual asymmetry in its emission lines have led to it being misclassified as a supergiant of type B8 Ia/Ib by SIMBAD and others. This asymmetry displays quasi-periodic behavior of the type found in about a third of all Be stars, with a period of about 10 to 17 years. This variation may arise from the precession of a one-armed density wave in the disk.

References

B-type main-sequence stars
Shell stars
Libra (constellation)
Durchmusterung objects
Librae, 48
142983
078207
5941
Librae, FX